Fox Lodge Cricket Club is a cricket club in Ballymagorry, County Tyrone, Northern Ireland, playing in the North West Premiership and current North West Senior Cup Champions

Honours
North West Senior Cup: 1
2022

References

Cricket clubs in Northern Ireland
North West Senior League members
Cricket clubs in County Tyrone